Joel Warren "Jay" Solomon (June 22, 1921 – July 30, 1984) was an American businessman who served as Administrator of the General Services Administration from 1977 to 1979. During his tenure, he worked to root out corruption in his agency.

A native of Chattanooga, Tennessee, he was the son of Abe J. and Ida Borisky Solomon. He was a graduate of Vanderbilt University. His family owned a move theatre chain, which they later sold and he became involved in developing shopping centers.

He died of heart failure on July 30, 1984, in Nashville, Tennessee at age 63. He was buried in Mizpah Cemetery in Chattanooga. The U.S. Post Office and Courthouse Building in Chattanooga was renamed in his honor.

References

1921 births
1984 deaths
Administrators of the General Services Administration
Tennessee Democrats
Carter administration personnel